Theodore II Palaiologos or Palaeologus (Greek: Θεόδωρος Β΄ Παλαιολόγος, Theodōros II Palaiologos) (c. 1396 – 21 June 1448) was Despot in the Morea from  1407 to 1443 and in Selymbria from then until his death.

Life

Theodore II Palaiologos was a son of the Byzantine Emperor Manuel II Palaiologos and his wife Helena Dragaš. His maternal grandfather was the Serb prince Constantine Dragaš. His brothers included emperors John VIII Palaiologos and Constantine XI Palaiologos, as well as Demetrios Palaiologos and Thomas Palaiologos, despots in the Despotate of Morea, and Andronikos Palaiologos, despot in Thessalonica.

When Theodore was a little over ten years old, his father proclaimed him a despot (despotēs) and appointed him to govern Morea after the death of his uncle Theodore I Palaiologos in 1407. The nobleman Nicholas Eudaimonoioannes was appointed as his tutor and regent until he came of age. The first period of his rule was a time of war against the Latin states in Greece for the unification of Morea. Theodore II's enemies in that period included the Republic of Venice, which sent troops to impede his attempt to conquer Patras. During Theodore's minority, his father Emperor Manuel II stayed in Morea and supervised its administration and defense, rebuilding the Hexamilion wall across the Isthmus of Corinth.

A moment of drastic change in policy was his marriage to the Latin noblewoman Cleofa Malatesta, arranged with the help of her uncle Pope Martin V, who became Theodore's ally and supporter. In a letter from around the time of Manuel II's death (July 21, 1425), Pope Martin V called Theodore II emperor of Constantinople (ad Theodorum imperatorem constantinopolitanum) but the crown actually passed to his older brother John VIII.

The war in Morea had started to go against the Byzantines and, under pressure from Carlo I Tocco, the Count of Kefalonia and ruler of Epirus, the Despot demanded help from his brother John VIII. That help came in the form of reinforcements led by their brother Constantine, who became joint governor of Morea with Theodore II in 1428. The united efforts of the brothers contributed to the naval victory at the Echinades in 1427 and the conquest of Patras in 1430.

On the other hand, Emperor John VIII declared Theodore's younger brother Constantine regent of the empire during his voyage to Florence in 1438, which emphasized his selection of Constantine as his intended heir.  The next several years were marred by disputes with Constantine over the succession to the childless John VIII.  In a compromise, Theodore II Palaiologos surrendered his claim to the throne in exchange for Constantine's domain (appanage) of Selymbria (Silivri) in 1443, where he died of plague five years later, in 1448, predeceasing his brothers.

Family
By his marriage to Cleofa Malatesta, an Italian aristocrat, Theodore II Palaiologos had at least one daughter:
 Helena Palaiologina. She married King John II of Cyprus.

Bibliography
 
 
 Joseph Freiherr von Hammer-Purgstall "Geschichte des Osmanischen Reiches"
 Edward Gibbon "The History of the Decline and Fall of the Roman Empire"
 George Sphrantzes : The Fall of the Byzantine Empire

1396 births
1448 deaths
15th-century Byzantine people
15th-century Despots of the Morea
Palaiologos dynasty
15th-century deaths from plague (disease)
Despots of the Morea
15th-century rulers in Europe
Sons of Byzantine emperors